Blagomir Mastagarkov (born 12 March 1992 in Plovdiv) is a Bulgarian footballer, currently playing for Maritsa Plovdiv as a forward.

Career
Born in Plovdiv, Mastagarkov is a product of Lokomotiv's youth system. He made his debut during the 2010–11 season on 19 September 2010 in a 0–3 away loss against Lokomotiv Sofia, coming on as a substitute for Dragi Kotsev. Mastargarkov has recently joined Hassocks FC in the Southern Combination Football League and impressed coming off the bench in a 3-2 loss to Newhaven. The promising substitute appearance has the likes of Liam Benson & Ben Bacon worrying for their county league futures, making the remainder of the season sitting on the bench looking all that more likely. During his post match interview Mastagarkov described captain Alex Spinks as one of the most influential players he has ever played with, stating he is looking forward to playing under such a fantastic leader, legend, man.

References

External links
Player Profile at Lportala.net

Living people
1992 births
Bulgarian footballers
Association football forwards
PFC Lokomotiv Plovdiv players
PFC Vidima-Rakovski Sevlievo players
First Professional Football League (Bulgaria) players